The 2014 AIHL season was the 15th season of the Australian Ice Hockey League (AIHL). It ran from 12 April 2014 until 24 August 2014, with the Goodall Cup finals following on 30 and 31 August. The Melbourne Mustangs won both the H Newman Reid Trophy for finishing first in the regular season, and the Goodall Cup after defeating the Melbourne Ice in the final.

Teams
In 2014 the AIHL had 8 teams competing in the league.

League business
In October 2013 it was confirmed that the Gold Coast Blue Tongues would remain suspended for the 2014 season. The team have until the 2015 season before their licence is reviewed. On 26 February 2014 Canberra Knights owner John Raut announced that the team had folded operations effective immediately and would not be competing in the upcoming 2014 season. Raut cited financial costs, lack of local players and poor performance as the reasons behind the move. The following day it was announced that the player group headed by captain Mark Rummukainen had approached the league with plans on taking on the club's licence. The following month the league announced that they had granted a provisional licence to a Canberra consortium, which involved the player group, to take on the licence and replace the Knights in the 2014 season. The new team was announced as the CBR Brave. The Melbourne Mustangs announced in March 2014 that they had signed a deal with MOAT: Mental Health Services who will become the teams naming sponsors for the 2014 and 2015 seasons. The team's name will change to MOAT: Melbourne Mustangs Ice Hockey Club. Air Canada expanded their sponsorship of the AIHL to the entire 2014 season after last year sponsoring the 2013 finals series. They also announced they will continue to show a highlights package of the 2013 finals series as part of their in-flight entertainment until the end of June. They will then replace it with the 2014 Canada Day Classic between the Sydney Bears and Melbourne Mustangs and the 2014 AIHL finals series.

Exhibition games
The first exhibition game was held in November 2013 with the Sydney Bears playing a match against former AIHL team, the Central Coast Rhinos. The Rhinos who previously played in the AIHL from 2005 to 2008 went on to win the game 8–4. A second game involving the Bears and Rhinos was held in March 2014 with the Bears winning 8–2. In February 2014 it was announced that the pre season tournament, the Wilson Cup, would be revived. The tournament was last played in 2009 and was won by the Rhinos. The 2014 edition features the Newcastle North Stars, Sydney Bears and the Sydney Ice Dogs. The tournament features a round robin of the three teams and finishes with a final between the top two placed teams. In started on 16 March and finished on 5 April. In the opening game of the Wilson Cup the North Stars defeated the Bears 4–3 in a shootout. The North Stars however lost game two to the Ice Dogs 5–4 in a shootout. In the last game of the round robin the Ice Dogs defeated the Sydney Bears 8–1 and they finished first in the standings. The Ice Dogs were drawn against the North Stars in the final who finished the round robin in second place. The Ice Dogs defeated the North Stars 4–2, winning their first Wilson Cup title. On 27 March the Melbourne Ice and Melbourne Mustangs held an exhibition game at the Medibank Icehouse with the Ice defeating the Mustangs 8–3. On 3 and 5 April the Australian national team held two exhibition games against the Mustangs and Ice. The two games were played at the Medibank Icehouse and were held as part of the team's preparation for the 2014 IIHF World Championship Division II Group A tournament being held in Serbia from 9 to 15 April. Australia won both of the games, defeating the Mustangs 9–3 and the Ice 4–1.

Personnel changes
In November 2013 Melbourne Ice announced that assistant coach Brent Laver has been promoted to the head coach position, replacing Sandy Gardner who had been in the job for only the 2013 season. The team also announced that former player, Glen Mayer had signed on as an assistant coach, along with former Swedish First Division player, Johan Steenberg, who was appointed back in June 2013. Just prior to the start of the season Perth Thunder Coach Stan Scott announced that he had stepped down as head coach in order to focus on the General Manager operations of the club. Scott was replaced by Dylan Forsythe as head coach and but remained on the coaching panel as an assistant. After eight games into the season it was announced that Forsythe had stepped down as head coach effective immediately for unknown reasons. He was replaced by Stan Scott who agreed to take over as interim head coach for the remainder of the season. On 24 April 2014 the Sydney Ice Dogs head coach Ron Kuprowsky and his assistants Colin Downie and Brad Andrlon had resigned from their positions. The club appointed Dion Dunwoodie as interim head coach with Mark Page and Anthony Wilson as his assistants. On 9 May 2014 the Ice Dogs signed Andrew Petrie as their new head coach.

Player transfers

Players signed

Players lost

Regular season
The regular season started on 12 April 2014 and ran through to 1 September 2014 before the top four teams compete in the Goodall Cup playoff series. Game 35 between the Newcastle North Stars and the Sydney Ice Dogs had to be postponed due to the North Stars bus breaking down en route to Liverpool. The game was later rescheduled for 22 June 2014 and will be played at the Hunter Ice Skating Stadium in Newcastle. Game 77 between the Adelaide Adrenaline and CBR Brave had to be postponed after the Adrenalines team bus crashed en route to the Phillip Ice Skating Centre. Head Coach Ryan O'Handley and some players were taken to hospital however none of the injuries were serious. Game 79 which was set to be held the following day between the Adrenaline and the Sydney Bears was also postponed. On 31 July it was announced that both games had been cancelled as the teams involved had been unable to reschedule the games. As a result, the AIHL Commission awarded each team one point for the cancelled games, with the Adrenaline getting one point from each game and the Brave and Bears awarded one point each from their respective games.

The Melbourne Mustangs won the H Newman Reid Trophy after finishing first in the regular season with 54 points. In the final week of the regular season the AIHL released the list of finalists for the 2014 awards. Mathieu Ouelette of the CBR Brave, Jack Wolgemuth of the Melbourne Mustangs and the Sydney Ice Dogs' Simon Barg were nominated as the Most Valuable Player, with Barg going on to win the award. Petri Pitkänen of the CBR Brave, Mathieu Dugas of the Perth Thunder and the Sydney Bears' Daniel Palmkvist were nominated for the Goaltender of the Year award with Petri Pitkänen being named the winner. Niko Suoraniemi of the Adelaide Adrenaline, John Kennedy of the Newcastle North Stars and the Melbourne Mustangs' Jack Wolgemuth were nominated for the Defenceman of the Year award with Wolgemuth being announced the winner. Jeremy Brown of the Melbourne Ice, Jamie Woodman of the Perth Thunder and the Newcastle North Stars Hayden Sheard were all nominated as the Rookie of the Year award with Jeremy Brown taking the award. David Dunwoodie of the Sydney Ice Dogs won the award for Local Player of the Year.

April

May

June

July

August

Standings

Source

Statistics

Scoring leaders
List shows the ten top skaters sorted by points, then goals.

Leading goaltenders
Only the top five goaltenders, based on save percentage with a minimum 40% of the teams ice time.

Season awards

Below lists the 2014 AIHL regular season award winners.

Source

Goodall Cup playoffs
The 2014 playoffs started on 30 August 2014, with the Goodall Cup final being held on 31 August. Following the end of the regular season the top four teams advanced to the playoff series with the Melbourne Mustangs and CBR Brave making their debut playoff appearance, along with the other two finalists the Melbourne Ice and Sydney Ice Dogs. All three games were held at the Medibank Icehouse in Docklands, Victoria, the home of the Melbourne Ice and Melbourne Mustangs. The series was a single game elimination with the two winning semi-finalists advancing to the Goodall Cup final. The finals were sponsored by Air Canada who also sponsored the 2013 playoffs. The Melbourne Mustangs won the Goodall Cup for the first time after defeating the Melbourne Ice in the final. Viktor Gibbs Sjödin of the Melbourne Mustangs was named the finals MVP.

Semi-finals
All times are UTC+10:00

Final

Notes
1: Game 77 between the Adelaide Adrenaline and CBR Brave was cancelled after the Adrenalines team bus crashed en route to the Phillip Ice Skating Centre. Game 79 which was set to be held the following day between the Adrenaline and the Sydney Bears was also cancelled. The games which were initially postponed were announced by the AIHL as cancelled after the teams involved had been unable to reschedule the games. As a result, the AIHL Commission awarded each team one point for the cancelled games, with the Adrenaline getting one point from each game and the Brave and Bears awarded one point each from their respective games.

References

External links
The Australian Ice Hockey League

2014 in ice hockey
2014 in Australian sport
2014